Lieutenant General Channira Bansi Ponnappa, PVSM,AVSM, VSM is a serving General Officer in the Indian Army. Currently, he is Adjutant General of the Indian Army. He has earlier served as the commander of the XI Corps. He also serves as the Colonel of the Mahar Regiment. As a UN peacekeeper, he is known for his role as commander of the United Nations' MONUSCO  forces in the North Kivu region of the Democratic Republic of the Congo during the M23 rebellion.

Early life and education
Ponnappa hails from the Nangala village near Bittangala in the Kodagu district. He attended the St Joseph's Boys' High School, Bangalore, a part of the batch of 1980. He then attended the St Joseph's College, Bangalore for a year before joining the National Defence Academy in 1981. He graduated from the Indian Military Academy in 1985.

Military career
Ponnappa was commissioned into the 2nd battalion, Mahar Regiment in June 1985. He commanded a company, combating the counter insurgency in Manipur. He attended the Defence Services Staff College, Wellington. He subsequently served as the Brigade Major of an Independent Armoured Brigade. As a Colonel, he later commanded his battalion in amphibious operations. He then served as the Colonel General Staff Operations (Col GS (Ops)) of an Infantry Division. Ponnappa also attended the College of Defence Management where he completed the Higher Defence Management Course.

Promoted to the rank of Brigadier, he commanded the Shakti Vijay Brigade (104 Infantry Brigade) along the Line of Control (LOC) in Jammu and Kashmir in 2012. As a representative of the Indian Army, he had flagged off an educational and motivational tour under Operation Sadhbhavana in Tangdhar area of north Kashmir's Kupwara district.  Ponnappa also attended the prestigious National Defence College, New Delhi.

UN Peacekeeping
In 2012, Ponnappa was sent to Goma in the Democratic Republic of the Congo as part of India's UN Peacekeeping Force deployment. He was appointed the Commander of MONUSCO's North Kivu Brigade (NKB). During the M23 rebellion in North Kivu, the UN Peacekeepers secured the airport and maintained status quo while the security responsibilities of Goma was shared between the police deployment, the formed police of MONUSCO and the MONUSCO military.

Ponnappa served under Brazilian Lieutenant General Carlos Alberto dos Santos Cruz and his predecessor Indian Lieutenant General Chander Prakash as Force Commander in March 2013. In 2013, the Indian Army planned and implemented a water treatment plant at Otobora, a Congolese village in Walikale, D R Congo, with MONUSCO's approval. The facility was inaugurated by Brigadier C B Ponnappa on 4 October 2014.

Promoted to the rank of Major General, Ponnappa took over command of the 28 Infantry Division in Gurez. As a Lieutenant General, he was the Chief of Staff of the Northern Command. He then assumed command of IX Corps as GOC, relinquishing it on 10 February 2022.

Awards and decorations
Ponnappa was awarded the COAS Commendation Card in 1997 and the GOC-in-C Commendation Card in 2006. In 2017, he was awarded the Vishisht Seva Medal and in 2019, the Ati Vishisht Seva Medal.

Gallery

References

Indian Army officers
Indian generals
National Defence Academy (India) alumni
United Nations military personnel
Kodava people
People from Kodagu district
Living people
Year of birth missing (living people)
Place of birth missing (living people)
People of the M23 rebellion
Indian officials of the United Nations
National Defence College, India alumni
Recipients of the Ati Vishisht Seva Medal
Recipients of the Vishisht Seva Medal
College of Defence Management alumni
Defence Services Staff College alumni